Uri Caine (born June 8, 1956, Philadelphia, United States) is an American classical and jazz pianist and composer.

Biography

Early years
The son of Burton Caine, a professor at Temple Law School, and poet Shulamith Wechter Caine, Caine began playing piano at seven and studied with French jazz pianist Bernard Peiffer at 12. He later studied at the University of Pennsylvania, where he came under the tutelage of George Crumb. He also gained a greater familiarity with classical music in this period and worked at clubs in Philadelphia.

Caine played professionally after 1981, and by 1985 had his recording debut with the Rochester-Gerald Veasley band. In the 1980s, he moved to New York City, where he continues to live. His solo recording debut was in 1992. He also appeared on a klezmer album (Don Byron Plays the Music of Mickey Katz, 1993) and other recordings with modern jazz musicians Don Byron and Dave Douglas, among many others.

Later years
Caine has recorded 16 mostly classical albums. His 1997 jazz tribute to Gustav Mahler received an award from the German Mahler Society, while outraging some jury members. Caine has also reworked Bach's Goldberg Variations, Beethoven's Diabelli Variations, as well as music by Wagner, Schumann and Mozart.

He was Composer-in-Residence of the Los Angeles Chamber Orchestra from 2005-2009.  He became a United States Artists Fellow in 2010.

In 2012 he performed with the Armenian State Chamber Orchestra in Yerevan, Armenia, and, in 2013-2014, was Composer-in-Residence at Mannes College.

The Bedrock Project and other collaborations
In 2001, he teamed up with drummer Zach Danziger to conceive an original project fusing live jungle and drum 'n' bass beats with fusion jazz called "Uri Caine Bedrock 3". They have toured worldwide, including with the New York-based DJ Olive.

Also in 2001, he released with drummer Ahmir "Questlove" Thompson of The Roots and Christian McBride an album called The Philadelphia Experiment which contains jazz, funk, instrumental hip hop and jazz fusion. This album was produced by Aaron Levinson and features collaborations such as Pat Martino on guitar and Jon Swana on trumpet.

In 2006, he recorded an album of composition from John Zorn's second Masada book called Moloch: Book of Angels Volume 6.  In November 2012, Caine collaborated with drummer Han Bennink to release a live album entitled Sonic Boom. In 2008 he was special guest of the Italian jazz awards red carpet show in Genoa (Italy) at Teatro della Tosse.

Discography

As leader/co-leader

As sideman
With Don Byron
Don Byron Plays the Music of Mickey Katz (Nonesuch, 1993)
With Dave Douglas
 In Our Lifetime (New World, 1995)
 Stargazer (Arabesque, 1997)
 Soul on Soul (RCA, 2000)
 The Infinite (RCA, 2001)
 Strange Liberation (Bluebird, 2004)
 Meaning and Mystery (Greenleaf, 2006)
 Live at the Jazz Standard (Greenleaf, 2006)
With Forma Antiqva
Antonio Vivaldi: The Four Seasons (Winter & Winter, 2011)
With Frank London
 Nigunim (Tzadik, 1998)
With Zohar
 Keter (Knitting Factory, 1999)

With John Zorn
 Voices in the Wilderness (Tzadik, 2003)
 Moloch: Book of Angels Volume 6 (Tzadik, 2006)
 Filmworks XXI: Belle de Nature/The New Rijksmuseum (Tzadik, 2008)
 Stolas: Book of Angels Volume 12 (Tzadik, 2009) - Masada Quintet featuring Joe Lovano

References

External links

BBC Radio 2
All About Jazz Interview
Uri Caine: Musical Midrashist
"In Conversation with Uri Caine" by Ted Panken, Jazz.com
Live concert recording, Madrid, May 2010

1956 births
Living people
Avant-garde jazz musicians
American jazz pianists
American male pianists
Jewish American musicians
Musicians from Philadelphia
Pew Fellows in the Arts
Alessa Records artists
Jewish jazz musicians
20th-century American pianists
Jazz musicians from Pennsylvania
American male jazz musicians
Winter & Winter Records artists
JMT Records artists
Tzadik Records artists
Blue Note Records artists
Jack M. Barrack Hebrew Academy alumni
20th-century American male musicians
21st-century American pianists
21st-century American male musicians
21st-century American Jews